A Drunken Dream and Other Stories is a Japanese manga anthology written and illustrated by Moto Hagio, collecting a variety of her short stories originally from 1970 to 2007.

Publication

The stories were selected by translator Rachel Matt Thorn to be an introduction to Hagio for English speakers, with the input of a mixi fan club for Hagio. The anthology also contains an interview with the author, and an article about the Year 24 Group, which Hagio belongs to.  Both supporting articles were excerpted from articles originally published in The Comics Journal #269. To launch the book, Hagio attended Comic-Con 2010. The manga is presented in unflipped format and the article about the Year 24 Group and the interview with Moto Hagio are presented as appendices in the left of the book, reading from left to right.

Volume list

Original place of publication:

Reception
Katherine Dacey describes "Bianca" as a "lovely, unabashedly Romantic story" and as "a meditation on artistic inspiration".  Dacey notes that other stories in the book "explore the complexity of familial relationships".  Dacey praised Hagio's ability to "make the ineffable speak through pictures". Snow Wildsmith praised the flow of the anthology and felt the anthology's theme was that of connections between people, recommending it to fans of Fumi Yoshinaga and Mitsukazu Mihara.  Wildsmith praised the details in Hagio's art, and felt that the art dated well. Publishers Weekly felt Hagio's works were more restrained and subtle than modern shōjo manga, saying that this reflects Hagio's wisdom and "creative strength". Lissa Pattillo describes the anthology as "a mature collection of stories that aims to provoke thought and feeling and succeeds endearingly". Thomas Zoth describes the presentation of the book as "part textbook, and part holy book".  His only complaint about the presentation of the book is that he found the font choice reminiscent of The Simpsons. Joe McCulloch feels that the title story is "more interested in evoking sensations of exquisite heartache and romantic frustration than delineating psychological realism or building suspense". Nicole Rudick feels that "The theme of spiritual crisis runs throughout Hagio's stories—from the mundane ('Angel') to the surreal ('Hanshin: Half-God') to the phantasmagoric ('A Drunken Dream')". David Welsh found it easy to sympathise with Hagio's heroes. Noah Berlatsky disliked the first four stories, suggesting that Hagio's characterisations are poor, and that a fantasy or science fiction setting can help to distract from this.

The volume has been nominated for an Eisner Award.

References

General

Specific

2010 manga
Fantagraphics titles
Josei manga
Manga anthologies
Moto Hagio
Shogakukan manga